This is a list of films produced or distributed by the German company Universum Film AG (UFA) founded in 1917 by a merger of several existing companies. It was the largest German studio during the Weimar Republic and continued this dominance during the Nazi era, where it formed part of a cartel along with Bavaria Film, Tobis Film and Terra Film.

It ceased active production following the Second World War, and its assets were put into a trust in a move by the Allied Occupation authorities to prevent too powerful a single German company being revived. Through the acquisition of the distribution company Prisma Film, the trustees were able to get around the ban around production in the mid-1950s. The UFA brand itself was revived from 1956 when the assets including the Tempelhof Studios were sold off to the Deutsche Bank. With the support of the West German government, it returned to production for several years but was unable to recapture the success of the earlier days and sustained heavy losses. A number of films released under these years were handled by the UFA-owned distributor Prisma Film. In 1964 the UFA was bought by Bertelsmann.

1910s

1920s

1930s

1940s

1950s

1960s

See also
 List of Tobis Film films

Bibliography
 Hardt, Ursula. From Caligari to California: Erich Pommer's Life in the International Film Wars. Berghahn Books, 1996.
 Kreimeier, Klaus. The Ufa Story: A History of Germany's Greatest Film Company, 1918-1945. University of California Press, 1999.

UFA GmbH films
UFA